<onlyinclude>

Approximately 100 species of mammal are known to inhabit, or to have recently inhabited, the Korean Peninsula and its surrounding waters. This includes a few species that were introduced in the 20th century; the coypu was introduced for farming in the 1990s, and the muskrat was introduced in the early 20th century into the Russian Far East, and was subsequently first recorded in Korea in the Tumen River basin in 1965. The Siberian tiger is the national animal of South Korea. The Siberian tiger and Amur leopard have most likely been extirpated from Korea, but are still included in standard lists of Korean mammals.

Most Korean mammal species are found only in a small part of Korea. The large southeastern island of Jeju, and the rugged northeastern Paektu Mountain region, are particularly known for their distinctive mammal species. Several species, including the Dsinezumi shrew, are found only on Jeju, while many other species, such as the wild boar, are absent or extirpated from there. Some mammals, such as the Manchurian wapiti, are considered natural monuments of North Korea, while others, such as the spotted seal, are considered natural monuments of South Korea.



Order Artiodactyla: even-toed ungulates 

<onlyinclude>

Order Carnivora: carnivores

Order Cetacea: whales

Order Erinaceomorpha: hedgehogs

Order Soricomorpha: shrews and moles

Order Chiroptera: bats

Order Lagomorpha: lagomorphs

Order Primates: prosimians and simians

Order Rodentia: rodents

See also
List of mammals in North Korea
List of mammals in South Korea

Notes

References and further reading

Mammals
Korea
Mammals